The Amsterdam Type Foundry was a type foundry based in Amsterdam, Netherlands.

History
The type foundry was established by Nicolaas Tetterode in 1851.

It contributed a number of original type designs early in the 20th century, some of which were designed by S. H. de Roos and Dick Dooijes.

In the 20th century, only two major typefoundries survived in the Netherlands. In Haarlem, the old typefoundry of Joh. Enschedé was their competitor. In order to divide the market, these firms kept a certain difference in type-height. Amsterdam: 66 + 1/24 point Didot, and Enschedé: 66 - 1/24 point Didot. Enough to prevent the combined use of their type.

Eventually, it became a division of Tetterode. On October 1, 2000, Tetterode transferred the rights for all of its typefaces to Linotype.

Typefaces

Foundry Type
These foundry types were produced by the Type foundry Amsterdam:
 Aigrette, script
 initials
 Arsis
 Atlas
 light
 normal
 bold
 Bristol (1929).
 Bodoni light
 Bodoni
 Bodoni semi bold
 Bodoni Bold
 Carlton (1929), an in-line version of Bristol.
 Choc (1964, Roger Excoffon) originally released by Fonderie Olive in 1955.
 Columbia, originally cast in 1904 as Kolonial by the Woellmer Type Foundry, also cast as Buffalo by the H.C. Hansen Type Foundry of Boston.
 Contura (1966, Dick Dooijes)
 De Roos (1947, S.H. de Roos).
 De Roos roman
 De Roos italic
 De Roos initials
 Egmont (1933, S.H. de Roos), later copied by Intertype (1937).
 Egmont
 Egmont light roman & italic
 Egmont bold
 Egmont inline capitals 
 Egyptian Bold, a nineteenth century design.
 Erasmus mediaeval
 Erasmus mediaeval roman
 Erasmus mediaeval italic
 Erasmus mediaeval initials (2 series)
 Excelsior, script
 normal
 light
 semi bold
 Garamont, based on the ATF design of 1917.
 Gracia, script
 Gravure (1912), a copy of G. Peignot et Fils' Moreau-le-Jeune.
 series 1
 series 2
 Gravure open
 Gravure decorative italic capitals
 Grotesque
 condensed light
 condensed
 bold
 small bold
 card grotesque caps light
 card grotesque caps bold
 Grotius
 Hermes (1924), a tooled version of Caslon.
 Hidalgo (1939, Stefan Schlesinger.
 Hollandsche Mediaeval
 Hollandsche Mediaeval roman
 Hollandsche Mediaeval italic
 Hollandsche Mediaeval semi bold
 Hollandsche Mediaeval ornamented initials & initialen
 Ideal
 Iris
 Impressum (1962, Baum + Bauer), originally cut for Stempel Type Foundry.
 Juno
 Libra, S.H. de Roos
 normal
 light
 Nobel
 light
 bold
 condensed
 condensed bold
 small capitals
 small capitals light
 inline capitals
 Old Dutch
 Pressa, originally cut by Intertype as Ideal News.
 Romaans (Riegerl Weissenborn), based upon Schelter & Giesecke's Romanisch and later copied as Intertype's Lormier.
 Reiner script
 Rondo, script
 normal
 bold
 Savoy
 Simplex
 normal
 semi bold
 Studio
 Typewriter
 Visite

Cold Type
These designs were produced by the Type foundry Amsterdam for photocomposition:
 Adonis (1971, Andrea Cretton), later cast in metal by Stephenson Blake.

References

External links

Dutch companies established in 1851
Letterpress font foundries of the Netherlands
Manufacturing companies based in Amsterdam